Ignacio Vásquez Jorge (born 4 December 1998) is a rower from the Dominican Republic. He competed in the 2020 Summer Olympics.

References

1998 births
Living people
People from Bonao
Rowers at the 2020 Summer Olympics
Dominican Republic male rowers
Olympic rowers of the Dominican Republic
Pan American Games competitors for the Dominican Republic
Rowers at the 2019 Pan American Games